Kalmanje Jagannatha Shetty (15 December 1926 – 7 April 2015) was a former judge of Supreme Court of India and retired Chief Justice of the Allahabad High Court who also served as acting chief justice of the Karnataka High Court. He was also the first Chairman of the National Pay Commission.

Bio

Born in a family of Ambalpadi-Udupi, Karnataka, India, Shetty graduated from the St. Aloysius College (Mangalore) in 1951 and later studied law in Osmania University in  Hyderabad, India. He also obtained a master's degree in law while practicing as an advocate in the period between 1954 and 1956. He has had an extensive practice in all branches of law and in particular, Civil, Service and Constitutional matters.

References

1926 births
2015 deaths
People from Udupi
Tulu people
Justices of the Supreme Court of India
Chief Justices of the Allahabad High Court
Judges of the Karnataka High Court
20th-century Indian judges